Wang Ying (born 15 February 1984) is a Chinese taekwondo practitioner. 

She won a silver medal at the 2003 World Taekwondo Championships. She won a gold medal in flyweight at the 2005 World Taekwondo Championships in Madrid, by defeating Brigitte Yagüe in the final. She won a bronze medal at the 2002 Asian Games.

References

External links

1984 births
Living people
Chinese female taekwondo practitioners
Taekwondo practitioners at the 2002 Asian Games
Taekwondo practitioners at the 2006 Asian Games
Asian Games medalists in taekwondo
Medalists at the 2002 Asian Games
Asian Games bronze medalists for China
World Taekwondo Championships medalists
21st-century Chinese women